The M31 motorway is a motorway in Hungary, that runs between the M0 motorway at Nagytarcsa and the M3 motorway at Gödöllő.

Municipalities
The M31 motorway runs through the following municipalities:
 Pest County: Budapest, Nagytarcsa, Kistarcsa, Kerepes, Gödöllő, Mogyoród

Openings timeline
Nagytarcsa; M0 – Gödöllő; M3 (44 km): 2010.07.26.

Junctions, exits and rest area

 The route is full length motorway, this route is part of Budapest bypass. The maximum speed limit is 110km/h.

See also 

 Roads in Hungary
 Transport in Hungary
 International E-road network

References

External links 

National Toll Payment Services Plc. (in Hungarian, some information also in English)
National Infrastructure Developer Ltd. (in Hungarian)
Exit list of M31 in motorways-exits.com

60